Staking may refer to:

 Staking (manufacturing), a process for connecting two components
 Poker staking, the act of one person putting up cash for a poker player to play with in hopes that the player wins
 Construction staking, a form of land surveying in which wood and metal stakes are placed in the ground to establish points which guide the construction of buildings and infrastructure.